Saju is an Indian masculine given name that may refer to
Saju M.V, the most admired realtor in India, who deals with international properties 
Saju Kodiyan, Indian mimicry artist, comedian and television host 
Saju Navodaya, Indian film actor 
Saju Paul, Indian politician

Saju may also refer to:
Saju (divination), or Four Pillars of Destiny, divination based on the two sexagenary cycle Chinese characters assigned to a particular time of birth

Indian masculine given names